Nathan Lawson (born September 29, 1983) is a Canadian professional ice hockey player. A goaltender, Lawson is currently playing with HPK in the Finnish top-flight Liiga. Lawson has previously played in the National Hockey League (NHL) with the New York Islanders and Ottawa Senators.

Playing career
Lawson started his career as a hockey player at the Olds Grizzlys, where he was active from 2001-04 in the Alberta Junior Hockey League. He then spent three years at the University of Alaska Anchorage, and played in parallel for their hockey team in the National Collegiate Athletic Association play. In the 2007-08 season the goalkeeper made his debut in professional hockey, initially for the Phoenix RoadRunners and then for the Utah Grizzlies in the ECHL.

From the 2008-09 season through 2010–11, Lawson was goaltender for the Bridgeport Sound Tigers in the American Hockey League (AHL), the affiliate of the New York Islanders of the NHL. Lawson made his NHL debut with the Islanders on December 18, 2010 in a 4-3 shootout loss to the Phoenix Coyotes, and played a total of ten games for the Islanders in the 2010–11 season.

On July 5, 2011, Lawson signed a one-year, two-way contract with the Montreal Canadiens. He spent the season with the Hamilton Bulldogs, playing 57 games and recording five shutouts. He signed a one-year, two-way contract with Ottawa on July 16, 2012.

On October 2, 2014, Lawson as a free agent ventured abroad to sign an initial try-out contract with Austrian club, Dornbirner EC of the EBEL. Lawson secured the starting position with the Bulldogs, and appeared in 37 games in the 2014–15 season, recording 19 wins.

On May 30, 2015, Lawson opted to continue in the EBEL, signing a one-year contract with fellow Austrian club, the Vienna Capitals. He made 44 EBEL appearances for the Vienna team during the 2015–16 season. He left the club after the season to move to Finland, where he penned a deal with HPK of the country's top-tier Liiga.

Career statistics

Regular season and playoffs

Awards and honours

References

External links

1983 births
Living people
Alaska Anchorage Seawolves men's ice hockey players
Binghamton Senators players
Bridgeport Sound Tigers players
Canadian ice hockey goaltenders
Dornbirn Bulldogs players
Elmira Jackals (ECHL) players
Hamilton Bulldogs (AHL) players
Ice hockey people from Calgary
New York Islanders players
Ottawa Senators players
Olds Grizzlys players
Phoenix RoadRunners players
Undrafted National Hockey League players
Utah Grizzlies (ECHL) players
Vienna Capitals players
Canadian expatriate ice hockey players in Austria
Canadian expatriate ice hockey players in the United States